Nicolás Saad (born 1970 in Buenos Aires) is an Argentine film director, screenplay writer, and film editor.

He works in the cinema of Argentina.

Saad is a graduate of Argentina's primary film school, the Universidad del Cine.

Filmography
Director
 Mala época (1998)
 La Piel de la gallina (1995)
 Un Ojo en la ruta (1993)

Writer
 La ignorancia de la sangre (2014)
 Atlas de geografía humana (2007)
 Mala época (1998)
 La Piel de la gallina (1995)
 Un Ojo en la ruta (1993)

Editing
 La Piel de la gallina (1995)

References

External links
 
 

1970 births
Argentine film directors
Argentine screenwriters
Male screenwriters
Argentine male writers
Living people
People from Buenos Aires